Raigh may refer to:

Raigh, the younger twin brother of Lugh's and one of the son of Nino's and the playable character from Fire Emblem: The Binding Blade
Raigh Roe (1922–2014), female Western Australian State President
Raigh (County Galway), one of the townland of County Galway
Raigh (County Mayo), one of the townland of County Mayo